The Cyprus Sailing Federation (CYSAF) (Greek: Κυπριακή Ιστιοπλοϊκή Ομοσπονδία, ΚΙΟ) is the national governing body for the sport of sailing in Cyprus, recognised by the International Sailing Federation.

Famous Sailors
See :Category:Cypriot sailors

Olympic sailing
See :Category:Olympic sailors of Cyprus

Yacht Clubs
See :Category:Yacht clubs in Cyprus

References

External links
 Official website

Cyprus
Sailing
1972 establishments in Cyprus